= Meteoprog.com =

Weather service in Ukraine

- Website type: weather service
- Available in: 30 languages
- Country of origin: Ukraine
- Website: https://www.meteoprog.com/

Meteoprog.com is a weather service originally from Ukraine, since 2003.

The service uses various weather real-time data and software tools to address weather-related challenges. The services rendered by Meteoprog enable the monitoring of weather patterns globally.

Being one of the earliest weather site initiatives in Ukraine, Meteoprog offers users actual and in-depth details on weather conditions and predictions in over 150,000 towns and cities worldwide.

Meteoprog.com represents the international edition of the METEOPROG, providing weather information in over 30 world languages.

According to Code Supply Co's rankings, the weather forecast service, Meteoprog, is listed among the top 15 best weather sites for timely updates and accurate forecasts.

== Science ==
The foundation for generating weather prediction data lies in the Weather Research and Forecasting (short WRF)—numerical weather forecasting algorithm, which is set up on a computing cluster. Every hour, Meteoprog servers analyze data collected from tens of thousands of weather stations globally enabling them to provide the precise weather forecast for any location in over 170 countries worldwide.

The WRF computational grid utilized by the METEOPROG project has a resolution of 27x27 km in flat regions, and 9x9 km in areas characterized by mountains or coastlines. This high level of detail allows for the generation of precise forecasts, particularly in areas where weather variations may be substantial over short distances. This is in stark contrast to global weather models that typically have a forecast grid step of 112 km.

The forecasting software utilized by METEOPROG, owned by STNL MEDIA INVEST LIMITED, was developed by project experts in partnership with the Ukrainian Center for Environmental and Water Projects (UCEWP) of the Academy of Technological Sciences of Ukraine.

Established in 1999 by the Academy of Technological Sciences of Ukraine and staff from the Institute of Problems of Mathematical Machines and Systems of the National Academy of Sciences of Ukraine, UCEWP serves as a scientific, engineering, and information center. Its specialty lies in creating software-based decision support systems for an array of applications, including weather forecasting, hydrological river patterns and flood predictions, coastal sea zone dynamics, environmental pollution, radiation safety, environmental and water systems management.

The center's experts actively participate in environmental mathematical modeling projects in collaboration with top scientific institutions from the EU, USA, and other countries. Such global involvement has earned UCEWP international recognition.

The primary authority at Meteoprog for numerical weather forecasting and atmospheric pollution is Dr. I.W. Kovalets, a leading researcher at the Ukrainian State University of Applied Sciences and holder of a Doctorate in Technical Sciences.

== Meteoprog services ==
Meteoprog's weather forecast offerings include weather maps, charts, meteograms, and other items.

Meteoprog also maintains a weather archive, which encompasses historical weather data from around the globe spanning the past 75 years.

The data collected and stored by Meteoprog aids in understanding weather pattern shifts over time, enabling predictions about future weather changes across the coming days, months, or even years.

In April 2024, Meteoprog released a weather app for Google Play. In the app, users can find current weather data for the day, week, and 10-day forecasts, as well as hourly weather updates. The app also provides information on the current air quality in various locations around the world, with city pollution levels visualized on a scale from 0 to 5, where 0 represents a clean city and 5 indicates high pollution.
